The 1898 Duquesne Country and Athletic Club football season  was their fourth season in existence. The team finished with a record of 10–0–1. The team was named the top team in western Pennsylvania. Roy Jackson was the team's captain and coach.

Schedule

Game notes

References

Duquesne Country and Athletic Club
Duquesne Country and Athletic Club seasons